Pastoral leases in Western Australia are increasingly known as "stations", and more particular – as either sheep stations or cattle stations. They are usually found in country that is designated as rangeland. In 2013 there were a total of 527 pastoral leases in Western Australia. And all leases were put up for renewal or surrender in 2015. 

Stations/pastoral leases are a significant part of Western Australian history. At different stages inquiries, pleas for extensions of lease times and royal commissions  have been made into the industry.

Nearly 90 million hectares or 36% of the area of Western Australia are covered by these stations. Despite the very low population involved in general management of stations, significant numbers of seasonal workers (shearers and others) have moved through the sheep stations to shear for wool.  Also more recently stations have been used as holding places of feral goats for export and meat production.

Administration
The current administration of leases is conducted by the appointed Minister for Lands of the day and the Pastoral Lands Board of Western Australia, which succeeded the Pastoral Board after changes to the Land Act of 1933 (repealed) and the new Land Administration Act of 1997. Further current policies and details of governance are updated within publications and websites administered by the Pastoral Lands Board.

In 2006 the Pastoral Lands Board within the Department of Planning and Infrastructure produced a 24-page pamphlet, which although appearing to be dealing with Outback issues, deals mainly with the process of accessing pastoral leases in Western Australia. The significant distances between stations and points of transport have seen droving or "stock routes" created in the past, such as the Canning Stock Route. Also the rail route to Meekatharra can be seen as a means of reaching into the station country to facilitate stock transport.

List
The list that follows is from various sources – abandoned, amalgamated, relinquished, and historical (no longer current) leases may be in the list.

The list includes the local government, and regional locations – for more specific locating of the stations, the Travellers Atlas of Western Australia map identifies all current pastoral leases.

A-C

D-J

K

L

M

N-P

Q-T

U-Z

See also
List of homesteads in Western Australia
List of the largest stations in Australia

References

Atlas/map references 

 Travellers atlas (1978 - present)

 
 Streetsmart Travellers Atlas of Western Australia  (2006)  Department of Land Information and West Australian Newspapers,10th ed. 

In the state Maps (Road Maps of Western Australia Maps 1-154)  'Pastoral Lease Stations' are identified with their names and boundaries.
Quality Publishing Australia.(2007) Roads & tracks Western Australia : campsites directory, roads and tracks, all in one  Jolimont, W.A.,Quality Publishing Australia, 5th ed  
Identifies homesteads but not specific pastoral leases.
 UBD Western Australia country road atlas (2005) Macquarie Park, N.S.W.UBD, a division of Universal Publishers,  11th ed  
Identifies only selected pastoral leases in the first 20 general maps of the volume.

Further reading
 Western Australia Pastoral Board (1984) Report of the Pastoral Board on the reappraisement of pastoral leases: as at 1 July 1984. Perth, W.A Dept. of Lands and Surveys.

Pastoral leases
Western Australia, Pastoral leases
Pastoral leases in Western Australia
Western Australia, List of pastoral leases